James William Malone (March 8, 1920 – April 9, 2000) was an American prelate of the Roman Catholic Church. He served as bishop of the Diocese of Youngstown in Ohio from 1968 to 1995.

Biography

Early life 
James Malone was born in Youngstown, Ohio, on March 8, 1920.  The son of a steelworker, Malone worked in a steel mill for a year to raise money for college.  He attend St. Mary's Seminary in Wickliffe, Ohio.  He later received a Doctor of School Administration degree from the Catholic University of America in Washington, D.C.

Malone was ordained a priest by Bishop James A. McFadden for the Diocese of Youngstown on May 26, 1945.

Auxiliary Bishop and Bishop of Youngstown 
On January 2, 1960, Pope John XXIII named Malone as the titular bishop of Alabanda and auxiliary bishop of the Diocese of Youngstown. He was consecrated on March 24, 1960, by Bishop Emmet M. Walsh. His co-consecrators were Bishops Clarence Issenmann and John Krol. From 1962 to 1965, Malone attended all four sessions of the Second Vatican Council in Rome  He backed initiatives of the Council that included using vernacular language in mass and increasing roles in the church for the laity.

Pope Paul VI appointed Malone as the third bishop of the Diocese of Youngstown on May 2, 1968, following the death of Bishop Walsh.  In 1972, Malone was diagnosed with stomach cancer, but was declared cancer-free after five years of treatment.  After the closing of Youngstown Sheet and Tube in 1977, 5,000 people in the Youngstown area lost their jobs.  Malone led an unsuccessful effort by clergy from different faiths to stop it.

Malone was a strong advocate of interfaith communication.  He was elected as the first Catholic leader of the Ohio Council of Churches.  He delivered sermons in Protestant churches and urged his priests to establish contacts with non-Catholic congregations. From 1983 to 1986, Malone served as the president of the National Conference of Catholic Bishops/United States Catholic Conference.

Retirement 
On December 5, 1995, Pope John Paul II accepted Malone's resignation as bishop of the Diocese of Youngstown. In 1999, surgeons removed one of Malone's kidneys.  In March 2000, he entered St. Elizabeth Hospital Medical Center in Youngstown, where his spleen was removed. James Malone died in Youngstown after surgery on April 9, 2000.

See also

References

1920 births
2000 deaths
People from Youngstown, Ohio
20th-century Roman Catholic bishops in the United States
Participants in the Second Vatican Council
Roman Catholic bishops of Youngstown